The Fokker V.27 was a German parasol-monoplane fighter prototype designed by Reinhold Platz and built by Fokker-Flugzeugwerke.

The V.27 was little more than an enlarged V.26 (prototype for the D.VIII) with a 145 kW (195 hp) Benz Bz.IIIb liquid-cooled inline engine. Once again, Fokker pursued similar aircraft with both rotary and inline engines. Fokker submitted the V.27 at the second fighter competition at Adlershof in May/June 1918.

The V.37 was a ground-attack variant of the V.27. It was fitted with extensive armor plating to protect the pilot and engine. Neither the V.27 nor the V.37 were placed in production.

Bibliography

V.27
1910s German fighter aircraft
Single-engined tractor aircraft
Parasol-wing aircraft